Ashover is a civil parish in the North East Derbyshire district of Derbyshire, England. The parish contains 83 listed buildings that are recorded in the National Heritage List for England. Of these, one is listed at Grade I, the highest of the three grades, and the others are at Grade II, the lowest grade. The parish is almost entirely rural, and contains the village of Ashover and smaller settlements, including Milltown and Ashover Hay. Most of the listed buildings are farmhouses and farmbuildings, houses, cottages, and associated structures. The other listed buildings include a church and items in the churchyard, chapels, public houses, a footbridge and a road bridge, a former watermill and a windmill, a pinfold, the chimney of a former engine house, a former school, and a telephone kiosk.


Key

Buildings

References

Citations

Sources

 

Lists of listed buildings in Derbyshire